In mathematics, Abhyankar's lemma (named after Shreeram Shankar Abhyankar) allows one to kill tame ramification by taking an extension of a base field. 

More precisely, Abhyankar's lemma states that if A, B, C are local fields such that A and B are finite extensions of C, with ramification indices a and b, and B is tamely ramified over C and b divides a, then the compositum
AB is an unramified extension of A.

See also 

 Finite extensions of local fields

References
. Theorem 3, page 504.
.
, p. 279.
 .

Theorems in algebraic geometry
Lemmas in algebra
Algebraic number theory
Theorems in abstract algebra